Eerste River (Eersterivier in Afrikaans, meaning "first river") is a town in the Western Cape, South Africa and a suburb of the City of Cape Town. It forms part of the Oostenberg subregion of the city situated behind the Stellenbosch/Vlaeberg Hills on the eastern outskirts of the city. . 

It lies on the R102 (Van Riebeek Road) about 40 km from Cape Town CBD and 8 km from Cape Town International Airport on the N2 route.

Eerste River started off as many different farms and expanded vastly after the 1980s. It is a diverse town; many of its almost 40,000 residents originally immigrated here from elsewhere. Among its beauty is the area called Penhill, hidden from the town and filled with nature.

Schools in Eerste River include the Afrikaans-medium Eersterivier Secondary School. Other schools in the area include Forest Heights Primary School, Palm Park Primary School, Stratford Primary School, Spurwing Primary School, Tuscany Glen Primary School, Melton Primary School, Helderkruin Primary School, Tuscany High School, Forest Heights High School, and in the surrounding areas Kleinvlei High School and Malibu High School.

Population statistics indicate that the suburb has close to 40,000 residents, but other estimates are closer to 52,000 when Kleinvlei, Palm Park and Penhill are included to the municipality - which are all still considered suburbs of Eerste River by locals and many visitors alike. 

Delft, Blackheath, Wesbank and Brentwood Park used to be a part of the town, but as the towns grew, all were given their own municipalities.

References

Suburbs of Cape Town